Morriss Peak is a peak,  high, at the southwest end of the Wiener Peaks, in the Ford Ranges of Marie Byrd Land, Antarctica. The peak was mapped by the United States Antarctic Service 1939–41, led by Richard E. Byrd, and by the United States Geological Survey from surveys and U.S. Navy air photos, 1959–65. The naming was proposed by Admiral Byrd for P.G.B. Morriss, manager of the Hotel Clark in Los Angeles, who provided office space and quarters for the Byrd Antarctic Expeditions of 1928–30 and 1933–35.

References

Mountains of Marie Byrd Land